The Beaver Wars, also known as the Iroquois Wars or the French and Iroquois Wars were a series of conflicts fought intermittently during the 17th century in North America throughout the Saint Lawrence River valley in Canada and the lower Great Lakes region which pitted the Iroquois against the Hurons, northern Algonquians and their French allies. 
As a result of this conflict, the Iroquois destroyed several confederacies and tribes through warfare: the Hurons or Wendat, Erie, Neutral, Wenro, Petun, Susquehannock, Mahican and northern Algonquins whom they defeated and dispersed, some fleeing to neighboring peoples and others assimilated, routed, or killed.

The Iroquois sought to expand their territory and to monopolize the fur trade with European markets. They originally were a confederacy of the Mohawk, Oneida, Onondaga, Cayuga, and Seneca tribes inhabiting the lands in what is now Upstate New York along the shores of Lake Ontario east to Lake Champlain and Lake George on the Hudson river, and the lower-estuary of the Saint Lawrence River. The Iroquois Confederation led by the Mohawks mobilized against the largely Algonquian-speaking tribes and Iroquoian-speaking Huron and related tribes of the Great Lakes region. The Iroquois were supplied with arms by their Dutch and English trading partners; the Algonquians and Hurons were backed by the French, their chief trading partner.

The Iroquois effectively destroyed several large tribal confederacies, including the Mohicans, Huron (Wyandot), Neutral, Erie, Susquehannock (Conestoga), and northern Algonquins, with the extreme brutality and exterminatory nature of the mode of warfare practised by the Iroquois causing some historians to label these wars as acts of genocide committed by the Iroquois Confederacy. They became dominant in the region and enlarged their territory, realigning the American tribal geography. The Iroquois gained control of the New England frontier and Ohio River valley lands as hunting ground from about 1670 onward.

Both Algonquian and Iroquoian societies were greatly disrupted by these wars. The conflict subsided when the Iroquois lost their Dutch allies in the colony of New Netherland after the English took it over in 1664, along with Fort Amsterdam and the town of New Amsterdam on the island of Manhattan. The French then attempted to gain the Iroquois as an ally against the English, but the Iroquois refused to break their alliance, and frequently fought against the French in the 18th century. The Anglo-Iroquois alliance would reach its zenith during the French and Indian War of 1754, which saw the French being largely expelled from North America.

The wars and subsequent commercial trapping of beavers was devastating to the local beaver population.  Trapping continued to spread across North America, extirpating or severely reducing populations across the continent.  The natural ecosystems that came to rely on the beavers for dams, water and other vital needs were also devastated leading to ecological destruction, environmental change, and drought in certain areas.   Beaver populations in North America would take centuries to recover in some areas, while others would never recover.

Background

French explorer Jacques Cartier in the 1540s made the first written records of the Indians in America, although French explorers and fishermen had traded in the region near the mouth of the Saint Lawrence River estuary a decade before then for valuable furs. Cartier wrote of encounters with the St. Lawrence Iroquoians, also known as the Stadaconan or Laurentian people who occupied several fortified villages, including Stadacona and Hochelaga. He recorded an on-going war between the Stadaconans and another tribe known as the Toudaman.

Wars and politics in Europe distracted French efforts at colonization in the St. Lawrence Valley until the beginning of the 17th century, when they founded Quebec in 1608. When the French returned to the area, they found both sites abandoned by the Stadacona and Hochelaga and completely destroyed, and they found no inhabitants in this part of the upper river valley—although the Iroquois and the Huron used it as hunting ground. The causes remain unclear, although some anthropologists and historians have suggested that the Mohawk Nation of the Iroquois Confederacy destroyed or drove out the St. Lawrence Iroquoians.

Before 1603, Champlain had formed an alliance against the Iroquois, as he decided that the French would not trade firearms to them. The northern Indigenous provided the French with valuable furs, and the Iroquois interfered with that trade. The first battle with the Iroquois in 1609 was fought at Champlain's initiative. Champlain wrote, "I had come with no other intention than to make war". He and his Huron and Algonkin allies fought a pitched battle against the Mohawks on the shores of Lake Champlain. Champlain single-handedly killed two chiefs with his arquebus despite the war chiefs' "arrowproof body armor made of plaited sticks", after which the Mohawk withdrew in disarray.

In 1610, Champlain and his French companions helped the Algonquins and the Hurons defeat a large Iroquois raiding party. In 1615, he joined a Huron raiding party and took part in a siege on an Iroquois town, probably among the Onondaga south of Lake Ontario in New York. The attack ultimately failed, and Champlain was injured.

Dutch competition

In 1610–1614, the Dutch established a series of seasonal trading posts on the Hudson and Delaware rivers, including one on Castle Island at the eastern edge of Mohawk territory near Albany. This gave the Iroquois direct access to European markets via the Mohawks. The Dutch trading efforts and eventual colonies in New Jersey and Delaware soon also established trade with the coastal Delaware tribe (Lenape) and the more southerly Susquehannock tribe. The Dutch founded Fort Nassau in 1614 and its 1624 replacement Fort Orange (both at Albany) which removed the Iroquois' need to rely on the French and their allied tribes or to travel through southern tribal territories to reach European traders. The Dutch supplied the Mohawks and other Iroquois with guns. In addition, the new post offered valuable tools that the Iroquois could receive in exchange for animal pelts. they began large-scale hunting for furs to satisfy demand among their peoples for new products.

At this time, conflict began to grow between the Iroquois Confederacy and the tribes supported by the French. The Iroquois inhabited the region of New York south of Lake Ontario and west of the Hudson River. Their lands were surrounded on all sides but the south by Algonquian-speaking tribes, all traditional enemies, including the Shawnee to the west in the Ohio Country, the Neutral Nation and Huron confederacies on the western shore of Lake Ontario and southern shore of Lake Huron to the west, and the Susquehannock to their south. These tribes were historically competitive with and sometimes enemies of the Iroquois, who had Five Nations in their confederacy.

Beaver Wars begin

In 1628, the Mohawks defeated the Mohicans, pushing them east of the Hudson River and establishing a monopoly of trade with the Dutch at Fort Orange, New Netherland. The Susquehannocks were also well armed by Dutch traders, and they effectively reduced the strength of the Delawares and managed to win a protracted war with Maryland colonists. By the 1630s, the Iroquois had become fully armed with European weaponry through their trade with the Dutch.

The Iroquois relied on the trade for firearms and other highly valued European goods for their livelihood and survival. They used their growing expertise with the arquebus to good effect in their continuing wars with the Algonquins and Hurons, and other traditional enemies. The French, meanwhile, outlawed the trading of firearms to their Indian allies, though they occasionally gave arquebuses as gifts to individuals who converted to Christianity. The Iroquois attacked their traditional enemies the Algonquins, Mahicans, Montagnais, and Hurons, and the alliance of these tribes with the French quickly brought the Iroquois into conflict directly with them.

The expansion of the fur trade with Europe brought a decline in the beaver population in the region, and the animal had largely disappeared from the Hudson Valley by 1640. American Heritage Magazine notes that the growing scarcity of the beaver in the lands controlled by the Iroquois in the middle 17th century accelerated the wars. The center of the fur trade shifted north to the colder regions of southern Ontario, an area controlled by the Neutral and Huron tribes who were close trading partners with the French.

Course of war
With the decline of the beaver population, the Iroquois began to conquer their smaller neighbors. They attacked the Wenro in 1638 and took all of their territory, and survivors fled to the Hurons for refuge. The Wenro had served as a buffer between the Iroquois and the Neutral tribe and their Erie allies. The Neutral and Erie tribes were considerably larger and more powerful than the Iroquois, so the Iroquois turned their attention to the north and the Dutch encouraged them in this strategy. At that time, the Dutch were the Iroquois' primary European trading partners, with their goods passing through Dutch trading posts down the Hudson River. As the Iroquois' sources of furs declined, however, so did the income of the trading posts.

In 1641, the Mohawks traveled to Trois-Rivières in New France to propose peace with the French and their allied tribes, and they asked the French to set up a trading post in Iroquoia. Governor Montmagny rejected this proposal because it would imply abandonment of their Huron allies.

In the early 1640s, the war began in earnest with Iroquois attacks on frontier Huron villages along the St. Lawrence River in order to disrupt the trade with the French. In 1645, the French called the tribes together to negotiate a treaty to end the conflict, and Iroquois leaders Deganaweida and Koiseaton traveled to New France to take part in the negotiations. The French agreed to most of the Iroquois demands, granting them trading rights in New France. The next summer, a fleet of 80 canoes traveled through Iroquois territory carrying a large harvest of furs to be sold in New France. When they arrived, however, the French refused to purchase the furs and told the Iroquois to sell them to the Hurons, who would act as a middleman. The Iroquois were outraged and resumed the war.

The French decided to become directly involved in the conflict. The Huron and the Iroquois had an estimated 25,000 to 30,000 members each. The Hurons and Susquehannocks formed an alliance to counter Iroquois aggression in 1647, and their warriors greatly outnumbered those of the Iroquois. The Hurons tried to break the Iroquois Confederacy by negotiating a separate peace with the Onondaga and Cayuga tribes, but the other tribes intercepted their messengers and ended the negotiations. During the summer of 1647, there were several small skirmishes between the tribes, but a more significant battle occurred in 1648 when the two Algonquin tribes passed a fur convoy through an Iroquois blockade. They succeeded and inflicted high casualties on the Iroquois. In the early 1650s, the Iroquois began attacking the French themselves, although some of the Iroquois tribes had peaceful relations with them, notably the Oneida and Onondaga tribes. They were under control of the Mohawks, however, who were the strongest tribe in the Confederation and had animosity towards the French presence.  After a failed peace treaty negotiated by Chief Canaqueese, Iroquois moved north into New France along Lake Champlain and the Richelieu River, attacking and blockading Montreal. By 1650, they controlled the area from the Virginia Colony in the south up to the St. Lawrence. In the west, the Iroquois had driven the Algonquin-speaking Shawnee out of the Ohio Country and seized control of the Illinois Country as far west as the Mississippi River. In January 1666, the French invaded the Iroquois and took Chief Canaqueese prisoner. In September, they proceeded down the Richelieu but were unable to find an Iroquois army, so they burned their crops and homes. Many Iroquois died from starvation in the following winter. During the following years, the Iroquois strengthened their confederacy to work more closely and create an effective central leadership, and the five tribes ceased fighting among themselves by the 1660s. They also easily coordinated military and economic plans, and they increased their power as a result.

Indian raids were not constant, but they terrified the inhabitants of New France, and some of the heroes of French-Canadian folklore are individuals who stood up to such attacks. Dollard des Ormeaux, for example, died in May 1660 while resisting an Iroquois raiding force at the Battle of Long Sault, the confluence of the St. Lawrence and the Ottawa Rivers, but saved Montreal by his actions. In 1692, 14-year-old Marie-Madeleine Jarret successfully frustrated an Iroquois attack on Fort Verchères.

Defeat of the Huron
In 1648, the Dutch authorized selling guns directly to the Mohawks rather than through traders, and promptly sold 400 to the Iroquois. The Confederacy sent 1,000 newly armed warriors through the woods to Huron territory with the onset of winter, and they launched a devastating attack into the heart of Huron territory, destroying several key villages, killing many warriors, and taking thousands of people captive for later adoption into the tribe. Among those killed were Jesuit missionaries Jean Brebeuf, Charles Garnier, and Gabriel Lallemant, each of whom is considered a martyr of the Roman Catholic Church. The surviving Hurons fled and were dispersed from their territory, some taking refuge with the Jesuits at Quebec, some assimilated and adopted by the Iroquois, others joined the Petun or Tobacco nation, another Iroquoian people to become the Wyandot. The Ottawa tribe temporarily halted Iroquois expansion further northwest, but the Iroquois controlled a fur-rich region and had no more tribes blocking them from the French settlements in Canada.

Diseases had taken their toll on the Iroquois and neighbors in the years preceding the war, however, and their populations had drastically declined. To replace lost warriors, they worked to integrate many of their captured enemies by adoption into their own tribes. They invited Jesuits into their territory to teach those who had converted to Christianity. The Jesuits also reached out to the Iroquois, many of whom converted to Roman Catholicism or intermingled its teachings with their own traditional beliefs.

Defeat of the Erie and Neutral
The Iroquois attacked the Neutrals in 1650, and they completely drove the tribe from traditional territory by the end of 1651, killing or assimilating thousands. The Neutrals had inhabited a territory ranging from the Niagara Peninsula westward to the Grand River valley.

In 1654, the Iroquois attacked the Erie tribe, but with less success. The war lasted for two years, and the Iroquois destroyed the Erie confederacy by 1656, whose members refused to flee to the west. The Erie territory was located on the southeastern shore of Lake Erie and was estimated to have 12,000 members in 1650. The Iroquois were greatly outnumbered by the tribes that they subdued, but they achieved their victories through the use of firearms purchased from the Dutch.

French counterattack
The Iroquois continued to control the countryside of New France, raiding to the edges of the walled settlements of Quebec and Montreal. In May 1660, an Iroquois force of 160 warriors attacked Montreal and captured 17 French colonists. The following year, 250 warriors attacked and took ten captives. In 1661 and 1662, the Iroquois made several raids against the Abenakis who were allied with the French. The French Crown ordered a change to the governing of Canada. They put together a small military force made up of Frenchmen, Hurons, and Algonquins to counter the Iroquois raids, but the Iroquois attacked them when they ventured into the countryside. Only 29 of the French survived and escaped; five were captured and tortured to death by the Iroquois. Despite their victory, the Iroquois also suffered a significant number of casualties, and their leaders began to consider negotiating for peace with the French.

The tide of war began to turn in the mid-1660s with the arrival of the Carignan-Salières Regiment, a small contingent of regular troops from France and the first group of uniformed professional soldiers in Canada. A change in administration led the New France government to authorize direct sale of arms and other military support to their Indian allies. In 1664, the Dutch allies of the Iroquois lost control of their colony of New Netherland to the English. In the immediate years after the Dutch defeat, European support waned for the Iroquois.

In January 1666, the French invaded the Iroquois homeland in New York. The first invasion force of 400 to 500 men was led by Daniel de Rémy de Courcelle. His men were greatly outnumbered by the Iroquois and were forced to withdraw before any significant action could take place, but they took Chief Canaqueese prisoner.

The second invasion force was led by Alexandre de Prouville, the "Marquis de Tracy" and viceroy of New France, from his base in Quebec City. The invasion force of about 1,300 men moved out in the fall of 1666. They found the Mohawk villages deserted, so they destroyed the villages and their crops. Prouville de Tracy seized all the Mohawk lands in the name of the king of France and forced the Mohawks to accept the Roman Catholic faith and to adopt the French language, as taught by Jesuit missionaries. The Iroquois sued for peace and France agreed.

Peace with France and Iroquois expansion
Once peace was achieved with the French, the Iroquois returned to their westward conquest in their continued attempt to take control of all the land between the Algonquins and the French. Eastern tribes such as the Lakotas were pushed across the Mississippi onto the Great Plains in the early 18th century, where they adopted the horse culture and nomadic lifestyle for which they later became known. Other refugees flooded the Great Lakes area, resulting in a conflict with existing tribes in the region. In the Ohio Country, the Shawnee and Miami tribes were dominant. The Iroquois quickly overran Shawnee holdings in central Ohio, forcing them to flee into Miami territory. The Miamis were a powerful tribe and brought together a confederacy of their neighboring allies, including the Pottawatomie and the Illini confederation who inhabited Michigan and Illinois. The majority of the fighting was between the Anishinaabeg Confederacy and the Iroquois Confederacy.

The Iroquois improved on their warfare as they continued to attack even farther from their home. War parties often traveled by canoes at night, and they would sink their canoes and fill them with rocks to hold them on the river bottom. They would then move through the woods to a target and burst from the wood to cause the greatest panic. After the attack, they returned to their boats and left before any significant resistance could be put together. The lack of firearms caused the Algonquin tribes the greatest disadvantage. Despite their larger numbers, they were not centralized enough to mount a united defense and were unable to withstand the Iroquois. Several tribes ultimately moved west beyond the Mississippi River, leaving much of the Ohio Valley, southern Michigan, and southern Ontario depopulated. Several Anishinaabe forces numbering in the thousands remained to the north of Lakes Huron and Superior, and they were later decisive in rolling back the Iroquois advance. From west of the Mississippi, displaced groups continued to arm war parties and attempt to retake their land.

Beginning in the 1670s, the French began to explore and settle the Ohio and Illinois Country from the Mississippi and Ohio rivers, and they established the post of Tassinong to trade with the western tribes. The Iroquois destroyed it to retain control of the fur trade with the Europeans. The Iroquois also drove the Mannahoac tribe out of the northern Virginia Piedmont region in 1670, and they claimed the land by right of conquest as a hunting ground. The English acknowledged this claim in 1674 and again in 1684, but they acquired the land from the Iroquois by a 1722 treaty.

During a raid into the Illinois Country in 1689, the Iroquois captured numerous prisoners and destroyed a sizable Miami settlement. The Miami asked for aid from others in the Anishinaabeg Confederacy, and a large force gathered to track down the Iroquois. Using their new firearms, the Confederacy laid an ambush near South Bend, Indiana, and they attacked and destroyed most of the Iroquois party, and a large part of the region was left depopulated. The Iroquois were unable to establish a permanent presence, as their tribe was unable to colonize the large area, and the Iroquois' brief control over the region was lost. Many of the former inhabitants of the territory began to return.

Defeat of the Susquehannocks
With the tribes destroyed to the north and west, the Iroquois turned their attention southward to the Susquehannocks. They attained the peak of their influence in 1660, and they were able to use that to their advantage in the following decades. The Susquehannocks had become allied with the colony of Maryland in 1661, as the colonists had grown fearful of the Iroquois and hoped that an alliance would help block the northern tribes' advance on the colonies. In 1663, the Iroquois sent 800 warriors into the Susquehannock territory. The Susquehannocks repulsed them, but the unprovoked attack prompted the colony of Maryland to declare war on the Iroquois.

By supplying Susquehannock forts with artillery, the Maryland colonists turned the tables on the Iroquois. The Susquehannocks took the upper hand and began to invade Iroquois territory, where they caused significant damage. This warfare continued intermittently for 11 years. In 1674, the Maryland colonists changed their Indian policy, negotiated peace with the Iroquois, and terminated their alliance with the Susquehannocks. In 1675, the militias of Virginia and Maryland captured and executed the Susquehannock chiefs, whose growing power they feared. The Iroquois drove the warriors from traditional territory and absorbed the survivors in 1677.

Resumption of war with France
English settlers began to move into the former Dutch territory of upper New York State, and the colonists began to form close ties with the Iroquois as an alliance in the face of French colonial expansion. They began to supply the Iroquois with firearms as the Dutch had. At the same time, New France's governor Louis de Buade tried to revive the western fur trade. His efforts competed with those of the Iroquois to control the traffic and they started attacking the French again. The war lasted ten years. 
 

In 1681, René-Robert Cavelier, Sieur de La Salle, negotiated a treaty with the Miami and Illinois tribes. France lifted the ban on the sale of firearms to the Indians, and colonists quickly armed the Algonquin tribes, evening the odds between the Iroquois and their enemies.

With the renewal of hostilities, the militia of New France was strengthened after 1683 by a small force of regular French navy troops in the Compagnies Franches de la Marine, who constituted the longest serving unit of French regular troops in New France. In June 1687, Governor Denonville and Pierre de Troyes set out with a well organized force to Fort Frontenac, where they met with the 50 sachems of the Iroquois Confederacy from their Onondaga council. These 50 chiefs constituted the top leaders of the Iroquois, and Denonville captured them and shipped them to Marseilles, France to be galley slaves. He then travelled down the shore of Lake Ontario and built Fort Denonville at the site where the Niagara River meets Lake Ontario. This site was previously used by La Salle for Fort Conti from 1678 to 1679, and was later used for Fort Niagara which still exists. The Iroquois retaliated by destroying farmsteads and slaughtering entire families. They burned Lachine to the ground on August 4, 1689. Frontenac replaced Denonville as governor for the next nine years (1689–1698), and he recognized the danger created by the imprisonment of the sachems. He located the 13 surviving leaders and returned with them to New France in October 1698.

During King William's War (1688–1697), the French formed raiding parties with Indian allies to attack English settlements, (as the English had allied themselves with the Iroquois against the French) perpetrating the Schenectady massacre in the colony of New York, the Raid on Salmon Falls in New Hampshire, and the Battle of Fort Loyal in Portland, Maine. The French and their allies killed settlers in the raids and kidnapped some and took them back to Canada. Settlers in New England raised money to redeem the captives, but some were adopted into the tribes. The French government generally did not intervene when the Indians kept the captives. Throughout the 1690s, the French and their allies also continued to raid deep into Iroquois territory, destroying Mohawk villages in 1692 and raiding Seneca, Oneida, and Onondaga villages. The English and Iroquois banded together for operations aimed against the French, but these were largely ineffective. The most successful incursion resulted in the 1691 Battle of La Prairie. The French offensive was not halted by the 1697 Treaty of Ryswick that brought peace between France and England, ending English participation in that conflict.

Peace

The Iroquois eventually began to see the emerging Thirteen Colonies as a greater threat than the French in 1698. The colony of Pennsylvania was founded in 1681, and the continued growth there began to encroach on the southern border of the Iroquois. The French policy began to change towards the Iroquois after nearly fifty years of warfare, and they decided that befriending them would be the easiest way to ensure their monopoly on the northern fur trade. The Thirteen Colonies heard of the treaty and immediately set about to prevent it from being agreed upon. These conflicts would result in the loss of Albany's fur trade with the Iroquois and, without their protection, the northern flank of the Thirteen Colonies would be open to French attack. Nevertheless, the French and Indians signed the treaty.

The French and 39 Indian chiefs signed the Great Peace of Montreal in 1701. The Iroquois agreed to stop marauding and to allow refugees from the Great Lakes to return east. The Shawnee eventually regained control of the Ohio Country and the lower Allegheny River. The Miami tribe returned to take control of Indiana and northwest Ohio. The Pottawatomie went to Michigan, and the Illinois tribe to Illinois. The peace lasted into the 1720s.

Aftermath
In 1768, several of the Thirteen Colonies purchased the "Iroquois claim" to the Ohio and Illinois Country and created the Indiana Land Company to hold the claim to all of the Northwest. It maintained a claim to the region using the Iroquois right of conquest until the company was dissolved in 1798 by the United States Supreme Court.

Many of the Iroquois people allied with the British during the American Revolutionary War, particularly warriors from the Mohawk, Cayuga, Onondaga and Seneca nations. These nations had longstanding trade relations with the British and hoped they might stop American encroachment on their lands. After the Americans emerged triumphant, the British parliament agreed to cede control over much of its territory in North America to the newly formed United States and worked to resettle American loyalists in Canada and provide some compensation for lands the Loyalists and Native Americans had lost to the United States. Mohawk Chief Joseph Brant led a large group of Iroquois out of New York to what became the reserve of the Six Nations of the Grand River in Ontario. The new lands granted to Six Nations reserves were all near Canadian military outposts and placed along the border to prevent any American incursions.

The coalition of Native American tribes, known as the Western Confederacy, was forced to cede extensive territory, including much of present-day Ohio, in the Treaty of Greenville in 1795.

See also

 American Indian wars
 Colonial American military history
 Fox Wars
 Military history of Canada
 Military history of the Mi'kmaq people
 Military of New France

Notes

Sources

External links
Timeline of the Iroquois Wars (1533-1650)

17th-century conflicts

New France
Colonial United States (French)
Military history of Canada
Military history of the Great Lakes
Military history of the Thirteen Colonies
Wars involving the indigenous peoples of North America
Genocide of indigenous peoples
Genocides in North America
Fur trade
History of the Midwestern United States
Native American history of Michigan
Native American history of Minnesota
Native American history of New York (state)
Native American history of Ohio
Native American history of Pennsylvania
First Nations history in Ontario
First Nations history in Quebec
Iroquois
17th century in North America
Algonquian peoples
Wyandot
Shawnee history
Innu
Abenaki
Wabanaki Confederacy
New Netherland